Last Exit is a 2006 Canadian action-drama television film starring Kathleen Robertson and Andrea Roth.

Synopsis

In a big city, Beth Welland is a divorced woman working as secretary in a law firm having problems with her boss and also financial difficulties to raise her ten-year-old handicapped beloved son, Benji. On the day of Benji's birthday, Beth's life is completely affected when she is cut off in traffic by the executive Diana Burke and misses the last exit in a highway, arriving late to her job. Meanwhile, Diana is under pressure, depending on her presentation to an important client to be promoted in the company where she works, but having family problems at home, with her unemployed husband, two teenagers and a secret pregnancy. This incident early in the morning together with the stressed situations along their day will entwine and affect their lives and destinies.

Cast
 Kathleen Robertson — Beth Welland 
 Andrea Roth — Diana Burke 
 Noah Bernett — Benji Welland
 Linden Ashby — Scott Burke 
 Vincent Davis — Nathan Burke
 Michelle Taylor — Breanna Burke
 Ben Bass — David 
 Cas Anvar — Constable Salam Barakat 
 France Viens — Constable Lauren Sharp 
 Gianpaolo Venuta — James Moore 
 Rachael Crawford — Catherine Vargas 
 Kent McQuaid — Daniel 
 Bruce Dinsmore — Mr. Rogerson 
 Andrew Johnson — Bob McArtle 
 Pauline Little — Courier Clerk
 Bjanka Murgel - Melina

References

External links 
 

2006 television films
2006 films
2006 action drama films
Films directed by John Fawcett
Canadian drama television films
English-language Canadian films
Canadian action drama films
2000s Canadian films